Rumi Rumiyuq (Quechua rumi stone, the reduplication indicates that there is a complex of something, -yuq a suffix, "the one with many stones", also spelled Rumi Rumiyoj, erroneously also Rumi Rumiroj) is a mountain in the Bolivian Andes which reaches a height of approximately . It is located in the Cochabamba Department, Carrasco Province, Pocona Municipality. Rumi Rumiyuq lies east of Qucha Quchayuq Urqu and southeast of Iskay Wasi.

References 

Mountains of Cochabamba Department